Diocese of Arkhangelsk and Kholmogory is an eparchy of the Russian Orthodox Church.

History
Kholmogory and Vazhsky Diocese Council established by decree in 1682, was composed of the north-eastern part of the territory of the Novgorod metropolis, the city of Arkhangelsk and Holmogory with counties, Kevrol, Mezen, Kola, Pustozersk, Vaga, a quarter Vazhsky to award a Ustyanovskimi parishes, the Solovetsky monastery.

Originally chair was in Kholmogory (1682–1762 gg.), The first head of the Diocese – St. Athanasius (Lyubimov) (March 1682 – September 1702).

In 1732 the diocese was renamed "Arkhangelsk and Kholmogory".

In 1762 the bishop's diocesan administration and authorities were finally transferred to Arkhangelsk (1702 – voivodship, from 1708 – the provincial capital).

By state in 1764 the diocese awarded 8th place among the 15 dioceses of class III.

On October 6, 1995 by the decision of the Holy Synod of the Russian Orthodox Church the Syktyvkar diocese was established. On December 27 – Diocese of Murmansk, Arkhangelsk and then was called and Kholmogory.

December 27, 2011 from the diocese have been allocated Kotlas and Naryan-Mar diocese, with whom Arkhangelsk diocese became part of the newly formed Metropolis of Arkhangelsk.

Bishops 
 Athanasius (Lyubimov) (18 March 1682 — September 6, 1702)
 Parthenius (Neboza) (December 3, 1703 — January 2, 1704) died before he could arrive on the chair
 Sylvester (Kraysky) (11 March 1705 - September 1707)
 Raphael (Krasnopolsky) (March 21, 1708-November 5, 1711)
 Barnabas (Volatkovsky) (August 24, 1712-October 8, 1730)
 Herman (Koptsevich) (May 2, 1731-July 25, 1735)
 Aaron (December 28, 1735 — May 7, 1738)
 Sabbas (Shpakovsky) (February 18, 1739-June 30, 1740)
 Barsanuphius (Schenykov) (July 13, 1740-November 8, 1759)
 Joasaph (Lisyansky) (December 2, 1761-May 1, 1769)
 Anthony (Gerasimov-Zabelin) (October 10, 1770 — July 9 1773)
 Arsenius (Vereshchagin) (December 22, 1773-April 1, 1775)
 Benjamin (Krasnopevkov-Rumovsky) (April 1, 1775-October 26, 1798)
 Apollos (Baibakov) (October 26, 1798-May 14, 1801)
 Eulampius (Vvedensky) (29 June 1801-16 April 1809)
 Parthenius (Petrov) (6 June 1809-22 July 1819)
 Joseph (Velichkovsky) (9 November 1819-3 July 1821)
 Neophyte (Dokuchayev-Platonov) (August 15, 1821-June 8, 1825)
 Aaron (Nartsissov) (February 14, 1826-August 16, 1830)
 George (Yashchurzhinsky) (August 16, 1830-June 30, 1845)
 Barlaam (Uspensky) (June 30, 1845-December 4, 1854)
 Anthony (Pavlinsky) (December 18, 1854-July 20, 1857)
 Alexander (Pavlovich) (November 17, 1857-September 13, 1860)
 Nathanael (Savchenko) (September 13, 1860-August 16, 1871)
 Juvenal (Karyukov) (August 17, 1871-December 25, 1876)
 Macarius (Mirolyubov) (December 25, 1876-May 23, 1879)
 Nathanael (Soborov) (May 23, 1879 — March 6, 1882)
 Serapion (Mayevsky) (March 6, 1882-February 16, 1885)
 Nathanael (Soborov) (February 16, 1885-June 3, 1890)
 Alexander (Zaķis) (June 3, 1890 - April 16, 1893)
 Sergius (Sokolov) (September 30, 1892 - January 1893) locum tenens
 Nicanorus (Kamensky) (April 16, 1893-February 10, 1896)
 Joannicius (Nadezhdin) (February 10, 1896-February 7, 1901)
 Joannicius (Kazansky) (February 7, 1901-October 31, 1908)
 Mikhei (Alekseyev) (October 31, 1908-April 17, 1912)
 Nathanael (Troitsky) (April 17, 1912-1921)
 Anthony (Bystrov) (March 1921 — August 11, 1931)
 Sophrony (Arefyev) (1924-December 27, 1927)
 Apollos (Rzhanitsyn) (August 11, 1931-January 1933)
 Nicephorus (Nikolsky) (January-October 19, 1933)
 Nikon (Purlevsky) (November 1, 1933-June 5, 1937)
 John (Sokolov) (June 5, 1937-November 1941)
 Michael (Postnikov) (February 12 — May 6, 1944) refused the appointment
 Leontius (Smirnov) (May 6, 1944-January 22, 1953)
 Gabriel (Ogorodnikov) (January 28 — July 24, 1953) locum tenens
 Theodosius (Koverninsky) (November 16, 1953-February 17, 1956)
 Nicander (Viktorov) (March 8, 1956 — March 16, 1961)
 Innocent (Zelnitsky) (March 16, 1961 — November 16, 1962)
 Polikarp (Priymak) (November 16, 1962 — January 27, 1966)
 Nikon (Fomichev) (January 27, 1966-June 11, 1977)
 Isidore (Kirichenko) (June 19, 1977-May 12, 1987)
 Panteleimon (Dolganov) (May 17, 1987-December 27, 1995)
 Tikhon (Stepanov) (February 4, 1996-October 20, 2010)
 Manuel (Pavlov) (October 20 — December 24, 2010) locum tenens
 Daniel (Dorovskikh) (December 24, 2010-September 30, 2019)
 Cornelius (Sinyaev) (from September 30, 2019)

See also 

 Russian Orthodox Church
 Eparchies and Metropolitanates of the Russian Orthodox Church

Arkhangelsk and Kholmogory
Eastern Orthodox dioceses in Russia